Vietnamese military ranks and insignia were specified by the National Assembly of Vietnam through the Law on Vietnam People's Army Officer (No: 6-LCT/HĐNN7) on 30 December 1981.

The Vietnam People's Army distinguishes three careerpaths: Officers (sĩ quan), warrent officer (quân nhân chuyên nghiệp), non-commissioned officers (hạ sĩ quan), and enlisted personnel (chiến sĩ).

Because the shoulder insignia of all ranks are represented by an elongated pentagonal epaulette, they are, hence, either detailed or colour-coded to indicate rank, branch, as well as unit.

The shoulder epaulettes from those of enlisted soldiers to field officers are detailed with a silver crest with an encircled silver star. Those of generals and admirals have fully golden epaulettes with corresponding golden crests and encircled stars.

Ranks can show information about branches of military personnel.

The branch colours that form the piping of the shoulder boards are as follows:
 Army (ground forces): red
 Navy: dark blue/navy blue
 Air Force/ Air defence: azure
 Border Defence: green
 Coast Guard: blue

The shoulder insignia ranks are in gold shoulder boards in the Ground Forces, Air Force and Navy.

Border Defense Force's ranks are in dark green shoulder boards with red piping. Coast Guard rank and rating insignia are in blue with gold piping.

Beginning in the 2010s, Navy officers were given gold sleeve insignia following the practice of most international navies, which are worn on the cuff in the full dress with the executive curl.

Table of ranks

Officers 
The following are rank insignia of commissioned officers of the People's Army. The People's Army of Vietnam is an integrated force, ranks are the same in all services, with an exception of the flag officers of the Navy.

Warrant officers 
The following are the insignia for warrant officers for the army, navy, air force, border guard and coast guard respectively.

Rank insignia used by warrant officers since 2008 have a pink silk line running along the shoulder board (before 2008 it was a V-shaped chevron) to distinguish them from the officer corps. Naval warrant officers also have a pink border on their cuff insignia in their service dress.

Enlisted 
The following are the rank insignia of non-commissioned officers and enlisted personnel.

Lapels

Historical ranks

Commissioned officer ranks

Other ranks

See also 
 History of Vietnamese military ranks
 Comparative military ranks
 Military rank
 People's Army of Vietnam (Military of Vietnam)
 Vietnam

References

External links 
 (Vietnamese military and police ranks)

Vietnam
Military of Vietnam